Negara  is the capital city of the Jembrana Regency in Bali, Indonesia.

Etymology  
Negara means city in the Balinese language. The word originates from the Sanskrit word Nagara, with the same meaning.

References

External links 
 

Populated places in Bali
Regency seats of Bali
Jembrana Regency